Alexander Salamon Airport  is a public owned public use airport located four nautical miles (8 km) north of the central business district of the city of West Union, in Adams County, Ohio, United States.

Although many U.S. airports use the same three-letter location identifier for the FAA and IATA, this airport is assigned AMT by the FAA but has no designation from the IATA (which assigned AMT to
Amata Airport in Amata, South Australia, Australia). The airport was named after Dr. Alexander Salamon, a refugee from Czechoslovakia who survived the Dachau concentration camp and immigrated to New York after the war. In 1953, he moved with his wife Lilly and daughter Suzanne to Seaman, Ohio, where another daughter Julie was born. Dr. Salamon served as a physician in Seaman and throughout Adams County until his death in 1971, at age 61. He donated the land from the family farm for the Alexander Salamon Airport because of his love and gratitude for the place that became home.

Facilities and aircraft 

It has one asphalt paved runway: 5/23 is 3,762 by 65 feet (1,147 x 20 m).

For the 12-month period ending September 17, 2015, the airport had 5,210 aircraft operations, an average of about 100 per week: 96% general aviation, 3% air taxi and 1% military. At that time there were 12 aircraft based at this airport: 92% single-engine, and 8% ultralight.

Gallery

References

External links 
 

Airports in Ohio
Buildings and structures in Adams County, Ohio
Transportation in Adams County, Ohio